İlkan Karaman (born May 13, 1990) is a Turkish professional basketball player for Formosa Taishin Dreamers of the Taiwanese P. League+ (PLG).

Professional career
Karaman made his professional debut in the TB2L with Tofaş Bursa during the 2007-08 season. He signed a contract with Pınar Karşıyaka after playing 4 years for Tofaş Bursa.

On August 17, 2012, Karaman signed a three-year contract with Fenerbahçe. In the 2012-13 season Karaman played in 29 games for Fenerbahçe in the Turkish Basketball League and 22 games in the EuroLeague. In the 2013 off-season he underwent arthroscopic surgery on both knees to relieve chronic patellar tendinitis, which prevented him from playing the following season. On July 1, 2014, he parted ways with Fenerbahçe.

On October 14, 2015, Karaman signed with Acıbadem Üniversitesi of the Turkish Basketball Second League.

On September 1, 2016, he signed with Beşiktaş for the 2016–17 season.

On July 12, 2017, Karaman signed with İstanbul BB. He left Istanbul after appearing in eight league games. On January 16, 2018, he signed with Büyükçekmece.

On November 14, 2019, he has signed with Cholet of the LNB Pro A.

On October 20, 2020, he has signed with Antibes Sharks of the LNB Pro B.

On January 20, 2021, he has signed with Petkim Spor of the Turkish Basketball Super League.

On September 30, 2021, he has signed with Semt77 Yalovaspor of the Turkish Basketball Super League.

On June 25, 2022, Karaman signed with Tofaş of the Turkish BSL and return to the club after 11 seasons.

On December 23, 2022, he signed with Manisa BB of the Turkish Basketbol Süper Ligi (BSL).

On January 20, 2023, he signed with Formosa Taishin Dreamers of the Taiwanese P. League+ (PLG)

NBA
Karaman was selected by the Brooklyn Nets with the 57th pick of the 2012 NBA draft. He became officially the first player drafted by the Nets after their move to Brooklyn (the team acquired two higher picks in exchange for cash after they were selected by other teams). After the draft the Nets general manager Billy King stated that the Nets intended for Karaman to develop his skills while continuing to play in Europe. This process (often referred to as "Euro-Stashing") allowed the Nets to retain Karaman's NBA rights without offering him a contract.

On July 10, 2014, Karaman's rights were traded to the Cleveland Cavaliers.

On November 18, 2020, Karaman's draft rights were traded to the Milwaukee Bucks, in exchange for a 2025 second round draft pick.

Turkish national team
Karaman was a regular Turkish youth national team player. He also played for Turkish national team in the EuroBasket 2013 qualification.

References

External links
 
 TBLStat.net Profile
 Euroleague.net Profile

1990 births
Living people
Beşiktaş men's basketball players
Brooklyn Nets draft picks
Büyükçekmece Basketbol players
Cholet Basket players
Fenerbahçe men's basketball players
Formosa Dreamers players
İstanbul Büyükşehir Belediyespor basketball players
Karşıyaka basketball players
Petkim Spor players
Power forwards (basketball)
Basketball players from Istanbul
Tofaş S.K. players
Turkish men's basketball players
Yalovaspor BK players
Formosa Taishin Dreamers players
P. League+ imports
Turkish expatriate basketball people in Taiwan